Matravers may refer to:

Places 

Langton Matravers, village in the Purbeck district of Dorset, England
Lytchett Matravers, large village in the Purbeck district of Dorset, England
Worth Matravers, village and civil parish in Dorset, England

People 

Nick Phillips, Baron Phillips of Worth Matravers, (born 1938), the Senior Lord of Appeal in Ordinary
Sarah Matravers (born 1974), English model and actress

See also 

 Matravers School
 Baron Maltravers